Rustia is a genus of flowering plants in the family Rubiaceae. There are about 14 species distributed in Central and South America.

Species include:
Rustia alba
Rustia angustifolia
Rustia bilsana
Rustia condamineoides
Rustia costaricensis
Rustia dressleri
Rustia formosa
Rustia gracilis
Rustia haitiensis
Rustia kosnipatana
Rustia occidentalis
Rustia rubra
Rustia schunkeana
Rustia simpsonii
Rustia thibaudioides
Rustia venezuelensis
Rustia viridiflora

References 

 
Rubiaceae genera
Taxonomy articles created by Polbot